The International Headquarters of the Salvation Army is located in London at 101 Queen Victoria Street, EC4V 4EH.

This is a modern building on a site which has been used by the Salvation Army for its headquarters since 1881.

External links
Salvation Army - International Headquarters

Headquarters in the United Kingdom
Salvation Army buildings